Power Rangers Dino Charge is the twenty-second season of the long-running television program Power Rangers. Using footage, costumes and props from Japanese 37th Super Sentai Series Zyuden Sentai Kyoryuger, it is the first season to be distributed by Saban Brands Entertainment Group, after the formation of two new units within the company called Saban Brands Lifestyle Group and Saban Brands Entertainment Group on December 11, 2014. The show is produced by SCG Power Rangers and began airing on Nickelodeon on February 7, 2015, ending on December 12. It also went broadcast on Pop in 2018.
Broadcast from May 25, 2015 and June 9, 2015 on M6.

The second season, and twenty-third overall, is called Power Rangers Dino Super Charge and premiered on January 30, 2016, ending on December 12, 2016.

Plot summary

Season 1: Dino Charge
Sixty-five million years ago, a dinosauroid alien named Keeper was pursued through the galaxy by Sledge, an intergalactic bounty hunter bent on acquiring ten magical stones called the Energems in Keeper's care and using them to conquer the universe. Keeper crash landed on prehistoric Earth, entrusting the gems to many dinosaurs for safe-keeping and crippled Sledge's ship with a bomb that left the bounty hunter stranded in deep space. Unfortunately, Sledge's collection of asteroids held in a tractor beam accidentally rained down on prehistoric Earth and ultimately caused the extinction of the dinosaurs.

In the present day, Keeper is found by paleontologist Kendall Morgan and they set up a base under the Amber Beach Dinosaur Museum in the city of Amber Beach. They begin a mission to find the Energems, but five have already been found by teenagers, who use them to morph into the Dino Charge Power Rangers. The group consists of the Red Ranger, Tyler Navarro, the adventurous leader of the group who is searching for his father who disappeared ten years ago on a geological dig; the Pink Ranger, Shelby Watkins, a waitress with a vast knowledge of dinosaurs; the Blue Ranger, Koda, a Cave man living in modern times as he found his Energem in his tribe's cave, and was kept in suspended animation until the present day; the Green Ranger, Riley Griffin, the youngest of the group who is a skilled fencing swordsman; and the Black Ranger, Chase Randall, the suave and laid-back New Zealander. With these powers, the Dino Charge Power Rangers fight against Sledge, Poisandra, Fury, Wrench, Curio, and their prison full of monsters in order to find the remaining Energems and protect Earth.

As time goes by, the Rangers are joined by additional teammates with additional Dino Zords: the Gold Ranger, Sir Ivan, an eight-hundred-year-old knight from Zandar who was trapped in the body of Sledge's minion Fury and the Graphite Ranger Prince Phillip III of Zandar, the modern day crown prince of Ivan's home country. Kendall takes over the position of the Purple Ranger from Albert Smith who abandons the position due to his fears of Fury's minions. New threats also emerge, including the human-like villain, Heckyl.

Season 2: Dino Super Charge
The Ranger team gets two new members: the Aqua Ranger, who is revealed to be Tyler's long lost father James and the Silver Ranger, who is revealed to be Zenowing, a follower and apprentice of Keeper. However, with new powers come new enemies in the form of Singe, a mysterious warrior who arrives on Earth and quickly steps in as Heckyl's number two, much to Fury's anger. However, Heckyl starts to get curious when he realizes that Singe knows more about the Energems than he admits. After the Rangers discover the location of the Titano Zord, Heckyl demands to know how Singe knew its location, only for Singe to flee and return to Earth with the person who hired him named Lord Arcanon, who holds the evil Dark Energem. It was Lord Arcanon who hired Sledge to bring him the galaxy's most dangerous monsters to make an army out of them. Arcanon's reign ends with the return of Sledge who destroys his former employer with Snide (who was split from Heckyl) before Sledge betrays him and let the Rangers destroyed Snide too and takes back leadership of his crew. At that time, Heckyl regains all of his memories as a good person, which he lost from the Dark Energem. The Rangers went back in time and destroyed Sledge and his crew in the past.

After their enemies' destruction, the Rangers go their separate ways as Koda and Ivan finally go back to their own times, Heckyl becomes the guardian of the Dark Energem as he and Zenowing return to Sentai 6, and Keeper returns to his home planet. The present day Rangers arrive back to their own time and find that it is a zoo and there are live dinosaurs since Sledge's asteroids never hit Earth and the extinction of the dinosaurs never came to pass.

Cast and characters

Dino Charge Rangers
 Brennan Mejia as Tyler Navarro, the Dino Charge Red Ranger
 James Davies as Chase Randall, the Dino Charge Black Ranger
 Yoshi Sudarso as Koda, the Dino Charge Blue Ranger
 Michael Taber as Riley Griffin, the Dino Charge Green Ranger
 Camille Hyde as Shelby Watkins, the Dino Charge Pink Ranger
 Davi Santos as Sir Ivan of Zandar, the Dino Charge Gold Ranger
 Reuben Turner (portrayal) and Daniel Musgrove (voice) as James Navarro, the Dino Charge Aqua Ranger
 Jarred Blakiston as Prince Phillip III, the Dino Charge Graphite Ranger
 Claire Blackwelder as Kendall Morgan, the Dino Charge Purple Ranger
 Alistair Browning as the voice of Zenowing, the Dino Charge Silver Ranger

Supporting characters
 Eve Gordon as Keeper (in-suit performer)
 Richard Simpson as Keeper (voice)
 Patricia Vichman as Moana
 Alexander Walker as Matt Griffin
 Mila Simons as Chloe Randall
Elizabeth Dowden as Kaylee
 James Gaylyn as Mr. Watkins
 Campbell Cooley as Mecha Voice
 Ryan Carter as Heckyl

Villains
 Adam Gardiner as the voice of Sledge, the main antagonist of the series 
 Campbell Cooley as the voice of Snide
 Paul Harrop as the voice of Fury
 Estevez Gillespie as the voices of Wrench and Curio
 Jackie Clarke as Poisandra
 Andy Grainger as the voice of Lord Arcanon
 Mark Mitchinson as the voice of Singe
 Mark Wright as the voice of Doomwing/Evil Dino Charge Silver Ranger

Episodes

Power Rangers Dino Charge (Season 1, 2015)

Power Rangers Dino Super Charge (Season 2, 2016)

Notes

References

External links

 Official Power Rangers Website
 
  (Nickelodeon)
 

 
Dino Charge
2015 American television series debuts
2016 American television series endings
2010s American science fiction television series
Television shows filmed in New Zealand
Television shows set in California
Television series about size change
Impact events in fiction
American children's action television series
American children's adventure television series
American children's fantasy television series
Television series about parallel universes
Television series about dinosaurs
Television series created by Haim Saban
Teen superhero television series